Hallypop (stylized in all lowercase with a 2D Kapuso Heart logo) is a Philippine free-to-air television channel owned by American company Jungo TV in partnership with GMA Network Inc. The channel was on test broadcast from September 6–19, 2020; and was officially launched on September 20, 2020. It operates daily from 6:00 AM to 12:00 MN.

Overview
Dubbed as the world's first Asian pop culture channel, Hallypop airs contents outsourced from SBS, including reality show (Running Man), music variety (K-pop Star, and JYP’s Party People), KBS' Music Bank, and from Front Row Channel which features live concerts with featured performances from the world's top musical acts.

History

Plans
In 2019, GMA Network Inc. announced its plans to invest for its second phase transition to digital television, including a partnership with U.S.-based global entertainment company Jungo TV and Philippine telecommunications conglomerate PLDT-Smart to distribute content across all of its channels. As part of their ongoing transition and the launch of their own digital television box, the network launched its first subchannel aside from their two main channels via Heart of Asia in the lineup of DZBB-DTV Channel 15.

Launch
On the morning of September 6, 2020, GMA Network made some adjustments on its digital television channels by adding new sub-channels on their digital frequency. The said programs were detected as early as 2:00am of September 6, 2020, at their digital frequency in Batangas, and 6:00am in Mega Manila.

Hallypop began its test broadcast on September 6, 2020, airing music programs such as Music Bank, StarGazeMuzik and HallyStage, while it airs promo plug of the upcoming programs with its assigned blocks. The channel was fully launched on September 20, 2020, with reality shows Running Man and Party People on their first broadcast.

Programming

Current programming

Arirang Korea
 After School Club 
 Gangnam Insider's Picks 
 I'm Live 
 Rolling in KPOP 
 Simply K-Pop

Hallypop & Jungo TV
 E-Sport 24 
 HallyStage 
 Scream Flix 
 Sidewalk Talk 
 Hallypop Fresh 
 Hallypop Hits 
 Hallypop Lokal 
 Hallyflix

KBS World
 A Style For You 
 KBS Song Festival 
 K Rush 
 Music Bank 
 The Return of Superman 
 We K-Pop 
 You Hee-yeol's Sketchbook

Previous programs

SBS
 K-pop Star 
 JYP's Party People 
 Running Man

Hallypop
 StarGazeMuzik 
 Merry FlixMas

Upcoming programs

See also
K-pop
Myx

References

External links
 

GMA Network
GMA Network (company) channels
English-language television stations in the Philippines
Television networks in the Philippines
Television channels and stations established in 2020
2020 establishments in the Philippines